Strand Frisian was a dialect of the North Frisian language which was originally spoken on Strand island, Duchy of Schleswig. Strand was destroyed in the Burchardi flood of 1634 with its remnants forming the islands Pellworm and Nordstrand which are now part of Germany. Strand Frisian is counted among the mainland group of North Frisian dialects.

History
The Frisian language became extinct on Nordstrand in the 17th century while it was spoken on Pellworm until the 18th century. After the 1634 flood, refugees from Strand brought their dialect to Wyk auf Föhr where it was spoken until the 19th century. Like the now extinct Wyk dialect, the Halligen Frisian can be seen as a continuation of the former Strand Frisian.

Notable works
The most notable piece of literature in Strand Frisian is a translation of Martin Luther's Small Catechism from the time before 1634. Other works include the "Yn Miren-Söngh" [A Morning Song] and "Yn Een-Söngh" [An Evening Song] by preacher Anton Heimreich (1626–1685) from Nordstrand. Knudt Andreas Frerks (1815–1899), a pastor from Wyk, wrote a translation of the Parable of the Prodigal Son in the Wyk North Frisian dialect.

References

Sources 

 The first part of this is 1. Nordstrander Sprachproben on pp. 1–4.

North Frisian language
Languages of Denmark
Extinct languages
Extinct languages of Europe
Extinct languages of Denmark
Extinct Germanic languages
Languages extinct in the 19th century
North Frisian Islands